The 1997 Des Moines mayoral special election was held on October 7, 1997, to elect the mayor of Des Moines, Iowa. It saw the election of Preston Daniels. Daniels became the city's first African American mayor.

Results

References 

Des Moines
1997
Des Moines
Des Moines mayoral 1997
Des Moines